Diphosphate—fructose-6-phosphate 1-phosphotransferase also known as PFP is an enzyme of carbohydrate metabolism in plants and some bacteria. The enzyme catalyses the reversible interconversion of fructose 6-phosphate and fructose 1,6-bisphosphate using inorganic pyrophosphate as the phosphoryl donor:

diphosphate + D-fructose 6-phosphate  phosphate + D-fructose 1,6-bisphosphate

In plants, the PFP is located in the cytosol of the cell and is strongly activated by the signal molecule fructose 2,6-bisphosphate.

PFP is an exclusively cytosolic enzyme that catalyses the phosphorylation of fructose-6-phosphate to fructose-1,6-bisphosphate in the glycolytic direction, and the de-phosphorylation of fructose-1,6-bisphosphate to fructose-6-phosphate in the gluconeogenic reaction.  Reeves first isolated PFP from Entamoeba histolytica, a lower eukaryote.  The first plant PFP isolated was from the leaves of pineapples by Carnal and Black and it has since been isolated from a variety of plant species and tissues.

Nomenclature 
This enzyme belongs to the family of transferases, specifically those transferring phosphorus-containing groups (phosphotransferases) with an alcohol group as acceptor.  The systematic name of this enzyme class is diphosphate:D-fructose-6-phosphate 1-phosphotransferase. Other names in common use include:
 6-phosphofructokinase (pyrophosphate), 
 inorganic pyrophosphate-dependent phosphofructokinase, 
 inorganic pyrophosphate-phosphofructokinase, 
 pyrophosphate-dependent phosphofructo-1-kinase, and
 pyrophosphate-fructose 6-phosphate 1-phosphotransferase, 
 pyrophosphate-fructose 6-phosphate phosphotransferase

See also
PFK

References

Further reading 

 

EC 2.7.1